Peredvizhniki, often called The Wanderers or The Itinerants in English, were a group of Russian realist artists who formed an artists' cooperative in protest of academic restrictions; it evolved into the Society for Travelling Art Exhibitions in 1870.

History 

In 1863 a group of fourteen students decided to leave the Imperial Academy of Arts in Saint Petersburg. The students found the rules of the Academy constraining; the teachers were conservative and there was a strict separation between high and low art. In an effort to bring art to the people, the students formed an independent artistic society; The Petersburg Cooperative of Artists (Artel). In 1870, this organization was largely succeeded by the Association of Travelling Art Exhibits (Peredvizhniki) to give people from the provinces a chance to follow the achievements of Russian Art, and to teach people to appreciate art. The society maintained independence from state support and brought the art, which illustrated the contemporary life of the people from Moscow and Saint Petersburg, to the provinces.

From 1871 to 1923, the society arranged 48 mobile exhibitions in St. Petersburg and Moscow, after which they were shown in Kyiv, Kharkiv, Kazan, Oryol, Riga, Odesa and other cities.

Influence of literary critics 

Peredvizhniki were influenced by the public views of the literary critics Vissarion Belinsky and Nikolai Chernyshevsky, both of whom espoused liberal ideas. Belinsky thought that literature and art should attribute a social and moral responsibility. Like  most Slavophiles, Chernyshevsky ardently supported the emancipation of serfs, which was finally realized in the reform of 1861. He viewed press censorship, serfdom, and capital punishment as Western influences. Because of his political activism, officials prohibited publication of any of his writing, including his dissertation; but it eventually found its way to the art world of nineteenth-century Russia. In 1863, almost immediately after the emancipation of serfs, Chernyshevsky's goals were realized with the help of Peredvizhniki, who took the pervasive Slavophile-populist idea that Russia had a distinguishable, modest, inner beauty of its own and worked out how to display it on canvas.

Subjects of the paintings 

Peredvizhniki portrayed the many-sided aspects of social life, often critical of inequities and injustices. But their art showed not only poverty but also the beauty of the folk way of life; not only suffering but also fortitude and strength of characters. Peredvizhniki condemned the Russian aristocratic orders and autocratic government in their humanistic art.  They portrayed the emancipation movement of Russian people with empathy (for example, The Arrest of a Propagandist, Refusal of Confession, and They Did Not Expect Him by Ilya Yefimovich Repin). They portrayed social-urban life, and later used historic art to depict the common people (The Morning of the Streltsy Execution by Vasily Surikov).

During their blossoming (1870–1890), the Peredvizhniki society developed an increasingly wider scope, with more natural and free images. In contrast to the traditional dark palette of the time, they chose a lighter palette, with a freer manner in their technique. They worked for naturalness in their images, and the depiction of people's relationship with their surroundings.  The society united most of the highly talented artists of the country. Among Peredvizhniki there were artists of Ukraine, Latvia, and Armenia. The society also showed the work of Mark Antokolski, Vasili Vereshchagin, and Andrei Ryabushkin. The work of the critic and democrat Vladimir Stasov was important for the development of Peredvizhniki's art. Pavel Mikhailovich Tretyakov showed the work of these artists in his gallery and gave them important material and moral support.

Landscape as the most popular genre of Peredvizhniki 

Landscape painting flourished in the 1870s and 1880s. Peredvizhniki painted mainly landscapes; some, like Polenov, used plein air technique. Two painters, Ivan Shishkin and Isaak Levitan, painted only landscapes of Russia. Shishkin is still considered to be the Russian "Singer of forest", while Levitan's landscapes are famous for their intense moods. The Russian landscape gained importance as a national icon after Peredvizhniki.

Peredvizhniki painted landscapes  to explore the beauty of their own country and encourage ordinary people to love and preserve it. Levitan once said, "I imagine such a gracefulness in our Russian land – overflowing rivers bringing everything back to life. There is no country more beautiful than Russia! There can be a true landscapist only in Russia".  Peredvizhniki gave a national character to landscapes, so people of other nations could recognize Russian landscape. The landscapes of Peredvizhniki are the symbolic embodiments of Russian nationality.

Reproduction of works 

Even though the number of travelling exhibition visitors from the provinces was increasing during the years, the main audience was the urban elite. Local photographers created the first reproductions of Peredvizhniki's paintings, which helped popularize the works  and could be bought at exhibitions. Niva magazine also published illustrated articles about the exhibitions. Since 1898 the landscapes of the society have been used in the postcard industry. Various books of poems were published with the illustrations of landscapes. Ordinary Russian people at that time could not afford to go to Moscow or Saint Petersburg, so popularization of Russian art made them familiar with a number of Russian art masterpieces. Even now publishers use the reproductions in textbooks as a visual icon of national identity.

Decline of creativity 

As the authority and public influence of the society steadily grew, government officials had to stop their efforts to repress the members. Attempts were made to subordinate their activity, and raise the falling value of Academy of Arts-sanctioned works. By the 1890s, the Academy of Arts structure was including Peredvizhniki art in its classes and history, and the influence of the artists showed in national art schools.

Gallery

Members 

Peredvizhniki artists included:

 Abram Arkhipov
 Ivan Bogdanov
 Nikolay Bogdanov-Belsky
 Pavel Brullov
 Nikolai Ge
 Kārlis Hūns
 Nikolay Kasatkin
 Alexander Kiselyov
 Ivan Kramskoi
 Arkhip Kuindzhi
 Nikolai Kuznetsov
 Isaac Levitan
 Rafail Levitsky
 Alexander Litovchenko
 Vladimir Makovsky
 Vassily Maximov
 Grigoriy Myasoyedov
 Leonid Pasternak
 Vasily Perov
 Konstantin Pervukhin
 Vasily Polenov
 Illarion Pryanishnikov
 Ilya Repin
 Andrei Ryabushkin
 Antonina Rzhevskaya
 Konstantin Savitsky
 Alexei Savrasov
 Valentin Serov
 Emily Shanks
 Ivan Shishkin
 Alexei Stepanov
 Vasily Surikov
 Vitaly Tikhov
 Apollinary Vasnetsov
 Viktor Vasnetsov
 Yefim Volkov
 Nikolai Yaroshenko
 Nikolai Zagorsky

References

Further reading 
 Society of Wandering Art Exhibits. Letters and Documents. 1869–1899. Vol. 1, 2., Publisher ‘Iskusstvo’, Moscow, 1987. Text in Russian
 Evgeny Steiner. “The Battle for ‘The People’s Cause’ or for the Market Case?” // Cahiers du Monde Russe, 50:4, 2009; pp. 627–646.
 Evgeny Steiner. “Pursuing Independence: Kramskoi and the Itinerants Vs. the Academy of Arts” // Russian Review, #70, 2011, pp. 252–271.

External links 

 "A battle for the 'people's cause' or for the market case" – Cairn.info
 Peredvizhniki (Wanderers), by Kristen M. Harkness, Smarthistory
 "The Seeds of Russia's Cultural Revolution: The Peredvizhniki (Wanderers) and The Society for Traveling Art Exhibitions"
 Society of Traveling Exhibitions Web Site 

 
 
1923 disestablishments
Organizations established in 1863
Russian art movements
Russian artist groups and collectives
Social realism